Ludwig Anton Salomon Fulda (July 7, 1862 – March 7, 1939) was a German playwright and poet, with a strong social commitment. He lived with Moritz Moszkowski's first wife Henriette, née Chaminade, younger sister of pianist and composer Cécile Chaminade.

Biography
He was born in Frankfurt. He was a member of the Prussian Academy of Arts and the first president of the PEN of Germany (1925–1932). He visited the United States in 1906 on the invitation of the Germanistic Society.

A Jew, he was removed from his work by the Nazis in 1933. Fulda committed suicide in Berlin in 1939 when he was denied entry into the United States.

Works
Fulda's creations used the relationships of his characters to develop the social and political issues of his time. Fulda's works include Das verlorene Paradies (1892; translated as The Lost Paradise, 1897), Der Talisman (1892), Jugendfreunde (1897) and Maskerade (1904). His novel Der Seeräuber was later freely adapted into the play The Pirate by S. N. Behrman. Fulda's 1901 play, Die Zwillingsschwester was adapted into the screenplay by Behrman and Salka Viertel of the American motion picture Two-Faced Woman (1941) starring Greta Garbo. Inspired by the story of Aladdin, he wrote Aladdin und die Wunderlampe. He also made numerous translations.

References

External links 
 
 
 

1862 births
1939 suicides
19th-century German novelists
20th-century German novelists
Writers from Frankfurt
19th-century German Jews
German translators
Translators to German
Suicides in Germany
German male non-fiction writers
Suicides by Jews during the Holocaust
German Jews who died in the Holocaust
1939 deaths